Maits Rest is an 800-metre self-guided circuit walk through cool temperate rainforest in the Otway Ranges near Apollo Bay in Victoria (Australia).  It is part of the Great Otway National Park.

External links
 Maits Rest

State parks of Victoria (Australia)
Otway Ranges